Amaloxenops is a genus of South American dwarf sheet spiders that was first described by R. D. Schiapelli & B. S. Gerschman de P. in 1958.  it contains only two species, both found in Argentina: A. palmarum and A. vianai.

References

Araneomorphae genera
Hahniidae
Spiders of Argentina